Diana Guadalupe Ortega Vivas (born 27 December 1999) is a Nicaraguan footballer who plays as a defender for the Nicaragua women's national team.

International career
Ortega capped for Nicaragua at senior level during the 2018 Central American and Caribbean Games and the 2018 CONCACAF Women's Championship qualification.

References 

1999 births
Living people
Nicaraguan women's footballers
Women's association football defenders
Nicaragua women's international footballers